Thierry Ascione was the defending champion, but lost in the final 2–6, 4–6, to Arnaud Clément.

Seeds

Draw

Final four

Top half

Bottom half

External links
 Main Draw
 Qualifying Draw

2009 Singles
Challenger DCNS de Cherbourg - Singles